Utricularia albiflora is a terrestrial carnivorous plant that belongs to the genus Utricularia (family Lentibulariaceae). It is endemic to Queensland, Australia.

See also 
 List of Utricularia species

References 

Carnivorous plants of Australia
Flora of Queensland
albiflora
Lamiales of Australia